The Database of protein conformational diversity (PCDB) is a database of diversity of protein tertiary structures within protein domains as determined by X-ray crystallography. Proteins are inherently flexible and this database  collects information on this subject for use in molecular research. It uses the CATH database as a source of structures for each protein and reports the range of differences in the structures based on their superposition and reports a maximum RMSD. The interface for the database allows researchers to find proteins with a range of conformational flexibility allowing them to find highly flexible proteins for example. The database is run and maintained by a group of researchers based at the Universidad Nacional de Quilmes in Argentina.

See also
Crystallography
Protein structure

References

External links
 

Biological databases
Protein structure
Crystallographic databases